Kabi Nazrul College, (also referred to as MKNC) established in 1985, is the general degree college in Murarai, Birbhum district. It offers undergraduate courses in arts and commerce. It is affiliated to  University of Burdwan.

Departments

Arts and Commerce
Bengali
English
History
Political Science
Geography
Philosophy
Commerce

Science 
General

Accreditation
The college is recognized by the University Grants Commission (UGC).

See also

References

External links

Universities and colleges in Birbhum district
Colleges affiliated to University of Burdwan
Educational institutions established in 1985
1985 establishments in West Bengal